Ralph Emerson McGill (February 5, 1898 – February 3, 1969) was an American journalist and editorialist. An anti-segregationist editor he published the Atlanta Constitution newspaper. He was a member of the Peabody Awards Board of Jurors, serving from 1945 to 1968. He won a Pulitzer Prize for editorial writing in 1959.

Early life and education
McGill was born February 5, 1898, near Soddy-Daisy, Tennessee. He attended school at The McCallie School in Chattanooga, Tennessee and Vanderbilt University in Nashville, Tennessee, but did not graduate from Vanderbilt because he was suspended his senior year for writing an article in the student newspaper critical of the school's administration. McGill served in the Marine Corps during World War I.

Career in journalism
After the war, McGill got a job working for the sports department of the Nashville Banner and soon worked his way up to sports editor.  In 1929, he moved to Atlanta, Georgia to become the assistant sports editor of The Atlanta Constitution.  Wanting to move from sports to more serious news, he got an assignment to cover the first Cuban Revolt in 1933.  He also applied for and was granted a Rosenwald Fellowship in 1938, which allowed him to cover the Nazi takeover of Austria in 1938. These articles earned him a spot as executive editor of the Constitution, which he used to highlight the effects of segregation.  In response, many angry readers sent threats and letters to McGill.  Some acted on the threats and burned crosses at night on his front lawn, fired bullets into the windows of his home and left crude bombs in his mailbox.

Syndicated columnist
In the late 1950s, McGill became a syndicated columnist, reaching a national audience. In 1960, McGill was the only editor of a major white southern paper to cover the passive resistance tactics used by the students involved in the Greensboro sit-ins, although eventually other papers followed his lead. He became friends with Presidents John F. Kennedy and Lyndon Johnson, acting as a civil rights advisor and behind the scenes envoy to several African nations.

Final years and legacy
In addition to the Pulitzer Prize, McGill received the Elijah Parish Lovejoy Award as well as an honorary Doctor of Laws degree from dozens of universities and colleges, including Harvard, and the Presidential Medal of Freedom in 1964. In 1963 he published his book The South and the Southerner as well as several anthologies of his newspaper articles. McGill died of a heart attack two days before his 71st birthday.  After his death Ralph McGill Boulevard (previously Forrest Boulevard) and Ralph McGill Middle School were named for him in Atlanta.  In his honor, The McGill Lecture is held annually at The Grady School of Journalism at the University of Georgia, featuring a nationally recognized journalist. In 1970 McGill was inducted into the Georgia Newspaper Hall of Fame.

His personal papers were donated to Emory University and are available at the Manuscripts and Rare Book Library (MARBL) at Emory University Library. Ralph McGill is mentioned by name in Martin Luther King Jr.'s Letter from Birmingham Jail as one of the "few enlightened white persons" to understand and sympathize with the civil rights movement at the time of the letter (April 1963). McGill's role in the campaign against segregation is depicted in Michael Braz's opera, A Scholar Under Siege, composed for the centenary of Georgia Southern University and premiered in 2007. A National Public Broadcasting Prime Time Special, Dawn's Early Light: Ralph McGill and the Segregated South (1988), documented his impact. Burt Lancaster voiced McGill and prominent figures appear such as Julian Bond, Tom Brokaw, Jimmy Carter, John Lewis, Vernon Jordan, Herman Talmadge, Sander Vanocur, Andrew Young, and Pulitzer Prize winning journalists Harry Ashmore, Eugene Patterson and Claude Sitton.

McGill is buried in Atlanta's historic Westview Cemetery.

Works

References

Further reading

External links
 
 Ralph McGill FBI File from Special Collections at Emory University's Robert W. Woodruff Library
 Ralph McGill at Britannica.com
Stuart A. Rose Manuscript, Archives, and Rare Book Library, Emory University: Ralph McGill papers, 1853-1971
 29 reasons to celebrate Black History Month: No. 9, Ralph McGill from The Atlanta Journal-Constitution

American male journalists
20th-century American journalists
American civil rights activists
Elijah Parish Lovejoy Award recipients
Presidential Medal of Freedom recipients
Pulitzer Prize for Editorial Writing winners
1898 births
1969 deaths
The Atlanta Journal-Constitution people
Journalists from Tennessee
Journalists from Georgia (U.S. state)
Sportswriters from Tennessee
People from Soddy-Daisy, Tennessee
United States Marine Corps personnel of World War I